Naveen Mayur (25 November 1978 – 3 October 2010) was an Indian actor who was known for his work in Kannada cinema. He appeared in more than 30 films starting 2000 before he died of jaundice in 2010.

Early life
Mayur was born on 25 November 1978. He completed his primary education from Sri Kumaran's School, Bangalore. Later, he joined National High School and subsequently the Sri Bhagawan Mahaveer Jain College where he obtained a degree in Bachelor of Business Management. Mayur began modeling later and was one of 25 models selected from South India for the Regional Scanning of Graviera Mr. India in 1997, but was disqualified because he was under-age to contest. He was subsequently introduced to film director Sunil Kumar Desai, who cast him in his first film, Sparsha.

Career 
Mayur began acting when in college and performed in plays such as Naanu Neenu. After his film debut with Sparsha, he was cast in T. S. Nagabharana's Neela.

Mayur was cast as the college-going Kiran in Ananda (2003), a remake of the 2001 Telugu-language film Aanandam, opposite Rutika. Srikanth of Deccan Herald wrote of his performance: "Naveen Mayur has come of age. He exudes confidence in his role and shows some excitement on the screen for the youngsters of his age." Mayur received praise for his role of a cancer patient in Uppi Dada M.B.B.S.. R. G. Vijayasarathy of Rediff.com felt that he "comes out with flying colours..."

Mayur also worked in television; he appeared in the popular soap, Danda Pindagalu.

Filmography

Death
On 3 October 2010, Mayur died of jaundice at the age of 32.

References

External links 
 

Male actors in Kannada cinema
Male actors in Kannada television
1978 births
2010 deaths